Strange and Beautiful is Aqualung's first US album release: a compilation of tracks from Aqualung's first two albums: Aqualung and Still Life. This compilation making up his first US release includes "Strange and Beautiful," "Brighter Than Sunshine," and "Falling Out of Love."

The track "Brighter Than Sunshine" reached #32 on the Billboard Adult Top 40 Chart in the U.S. Strange and Beautiful reached #108 on the Billboard Top 200 and also hit #1 on the Top Heatseekers Chart. As of December 2006, the album has sold over 250,000 copies in the US.

The song "Left Behind" (Track 7) was used in a series of commercials for Chrysler.
The song 'Strange and Beautiful' is also featured on the soundtrack of the motion picture Wicker Park as well as the film A Lot Like Love.

Track listing
"Strange & Beautiful (I'll Put a Spell on You)" – 3:51
"Falling Out of Love" – 4:03
"Good Times Gonna Come" – 3:53
"Brighter Than Sunshine" – 4:01
"Breaking My Heart" – 3:29
"Tongue-Tied" – 3:52
"Left Behind" – 3:47
"You Turn Me Round" – 4:19
"If I Fall" – 4:54
"Easier to Lie" – 3:14
"Extra Ordinary Thing" – 3:18
"Another Little Hole" – 5:34

References

Aqualung (musician) compilation albums
2005 compilation albums